Umberto Germano (born 22 April 1992) is an Italian footballer who plays as a defender for  club Triestina.

Club career

Early career
Born in Cigliano, Piedmont, Germano was signed by Canavese from BarcanovaSalus in 2007. On 31 July 2008 he was signed by Juventus F.C. in a definitive deal. He was the member of the under-17 football team in 2008–09 season. In the next season he was a member of the reserve B - Berretti. He was a player for Juve in 2010 , scoring once against Cremonese. Germano also played for reserve A occasionally.

Germano was a player for Canavese in 2010–11 Lega Pro Seconda Divisione, as well as for their reserve team. He also returned to Juventus "Primavera" reserve team in May 2011.

Pro Vercelli
In July 2011 Germano was signed by another Piedmontese club Pro Vercelli. The club won the playoffs of 2011–12 Lega Pro Prima Divisione and promoted to Serie B after half a century wait. He also played once for the representative team of Lega Pro against San Marino in June 2012. Pro Vercelli finished as the 21st of 2012–13 Serie B and relegated back to the third division. On 24 August 2013 Germano was signed by Lanciano in a temporary deal, fellow Serie B struggler of last season which finished just above the relegated teams as the 18th. As part of the deal, Vincenzo Pepe left for Vercelli definitely.

On 2 July 2015 Germano signed a new three-year contract.

Padova
On 2 July 2019, he signed a 3-year contract with Padova.

Triestina
On 5 January 2023, Germano joined Triestina on a 2.5-year deal.

References

External links
 Lega Serie B profile 

1992 births
Living people
People from Cigliano
Sportspeople from the Province of Vercelli
Footballers from Piedmont
Italian footballers
Association football midfielders
Serie B players
Serie C players
Juventus F.C. players
F.C. Canavese players
F.C. Pro Vercelli 1892 players
S.S. Virtus Lanciano 1924 players
Calcio Padova players
U.S. Triestina Calcio 1918 players